Canterbury are a New Zealand professional rugby union team based in Canterbury, New Zealand. The union was originally established in 1879, with the National Provincial Championship established in 1976. They now play in the reformed National Provincial Championship competition. They play their home games at Orangetheory Stadium in Christchurch in the Canterbury region. The team is affiliated with the Crusaders Super Rugby franchise. Their home playing colours are black and red.

Current squad

The Canterbury squad for the 2022 Bunnings NPC is:

Honours

Canterbury have been overall Champions on 14 occasions. Their first title was in 1977 and their most recent title was in 2017. Their full list of honours include:

National Provincial Championship First Division
Winners: 1977, 1983, 1997, 2001, 2004

Air New Zealand Cup
Winners: 2008, 2009

ITM Cup
Winners: 2010

ITM Cup Premiership Division
Winners: 2011, 2012, 2013, 2015

Mitre 10 Cup Premiership Division
Winners: 2016, 2017

Current Super Rugby players
Players named in the 2022 Canterbury squad, who also earned contracts or were named in a squad for any side participating in the 2022 Super Rugby Pacific season.

References

External links
Official site
Supporters Club

Sport in Canterbury, New Zealand
National Provincial Championship
New Zealand rugby union teams